Hot Rap Songs is a record chart published by the music industry magazine Billboard which ranks the most popular hip hop songs in the United States. With hip hop having greatly increased in mainstream popularity in the late 1980s, Billboard introduced the chart in their March 11, 1989 issue under the name Hot Rap Singles. Prior to the addition of the chart, hip hop music had been profiled in the magazine's "The Rhythm & the Blues" column and disco-related sections, while some rap records made appearances on the related Hot Black Singles chart. The inaugural number-one single on Hot Rap Singles was "Self Destruction" by the Stop the Violence Movement. From its 1989 inception until 2001, the chart was based solely on each single's weekly sales. To formulate chart rankings, Billboard assembled a panel of selected record stores to provide reports of each week's top-selling singles.

Between 1989 and 1999, 173 singles topped the Hot Rap Singles chart, with "Hot Boyz" by Missy Elliott featuring Nas, Eve and Q-Tip being the final number-one single of the 1990s. The single's 18-week reign at the top spot extended into the next decade, and until 2019 it held the record for the most weeks at number one in the chart's history. LL Cool J and Puff Daddy each attained nine number-one hits on the Hot Rap Singles chart during its first 11 years, the most for any artist during this period. In a 25th anniversary listing of the top 100 songs in the history of Hot Rap Songs based on chart performance, "Me So Horny" by the 2 Live Crew and "Tootsee Roll" by 69 Boyz were the highest-ranked singles of the 1980s and 1990s respectively.

Number-one singles

References

Bibliography

External links
 Hot Rap Songs at Billboard

Lists of number-one rap songs in the United States
United States rap singles
United States rap singles
1980s in hip hop music
1990s in hip hop music